Heptasaurus is an extinct genus of Triassic capitosaurian temnospondyl amphibian within the family Mastodonsauridae.

References

Capitosaurs
Triassic temnospondyls of Europe
Fossil taxa described in 1935